This is list of towns and villages of Latur district of Maharashtra State in India.

Latur district is one of the 36 districts in the Maharashtra state of India. The district is on the southern boundary and falls under the Aurangabad division of the state.

Until 1 August 2014 the district was divided into 10 talukas.

The following are separate Talukawise (Sub-Districts) lists of towns/villages in the Latur district.

Ahmedpur Taluka

Ausa Taluka

Chakur Taluka

Deoni Taluka

Jalkot Taluka

Latur Taluka

Nilanga Taluka

Renapur Taluka

Shirur Anantpal Taluka

Udgir Taluka

References